Cochemiea angelensis is a species of plant in the family Cactaceae. It is endemic to Mexico, and can be found close to sea level, partway down the Baja California Peninsula. Its shape is globose or short cylindrical, and grows up to 15 cm high. The flowers have two distinct color forms. The first is white, with pinkish midstripes on the outer petals; the second is much more deeply colored, with deep pink petals and maroon midstripe. These grow to 20 mm in length and 30 mm in diameter.

References
 Mammillarias.net page on M. angelensis. Accessed 2 May 2009.

angelensis
Cacti of Mexico
Endemic flora of Mexico